Daniel Patricio Angulo Arroyo (born 16 November 1986) is an Ecuadorian footballer who plays as a forward for Ecuadorian Serie A club Orense.

Honours
Santa Fe
Copa Sudamericana (1): 2015

CSA
 Campeonato Brasileiro Série C (1): 2017
 Campeonato Alagoano (1): 2018

External links

1986 births
Living people
Ecuadorian footballers
Ecuadorian expatriate footballers
Sportspeople from Esmeraldas, Ecuador
Association football forwards
Ecuador international footballers
2015 Copa América players
C.D. Técnico Universitario footballers
C.S. Norte América footballers
S.D. Aucas footballers
Imbabura S.C. footballers
C.S.D. Independiente del Valle footballers
Independiente Santa Fe footballers
L.D.U. Quito footballers
Deportivo Pasto footballers
Centro Sportivo Alagoano players
R&F (Hong Kong) players
Orense S.C. players
Ecuadorian Serie A players
Categoría Primera A players
Campeonato Brasileiro Série C players
Hong Kong Premier League players
Ecuadorian expatriate sportspeople in Colombia
Ecuadorian expatriate sportspeople in Brazil
Expatriate footballers in Colombia
Expatriate footballers in Brazil
Expatriate footballers in Hong Kong